Kyle Loyd Riddle (December 19, 1913 – November 16, 2008) was a brigadier general in the United States Air Force. During World War II, he commanded the Eighth Air Force 479th Fighter Group which was known as "Riddle's Raiders".

See also
Hubert Zemke

References

External links

1913 births
2008 deaths
United States Army Air Forces personnel of World War II
United States Air Force generals
People from Decatur, Texas
Texas A&M University alumni
Air War College alumni
Decatur Baptist College alumni
Military personnel from Texas